Justin Jaworski (born June 21, 1999) is an American professional basketball player, who most recently played for the Iowa Wolves of the NBA G League. He played college basketball for the Lafayette Leopards.

High school career
Jaworski played basketball for Perkiomen Valley High School in Collegeville, Pennsylvania. He averaged 22.2 points per game as a senior, and was named All-Area Player of the Year by The Mercury. Jaworski committed to playing college basketball for Lafayette, his only other NCAA Division I offer coming from American. He was also a standout football player in high school and turned down over 20 college football offers.

College career
On November 29, 2017, Jaworski scored a freshman season-high 24 points in a 74–70 loss to Drexel. As a freshman, he averaged 10.8 points and 2.2 rebounds per game. On November 7, 2018, Jaworski posted a sophomore season-high 28 points and five rebounds in a 93–86 loss to Saint Peter's. He averaged 14.6 points, 2.9 rebounds and 2.7 assists per game as a sophomore, earning Third Team All-Patriot League recognition. Jaworski shot 48.9 percent from three-point range, which ranked second in the nation. On February 1, 2020, he scored a junior season-high 32 points in an 82–70 win against American. Jaworski missed the final seven games of the season with a torn anterior cruciate ligament. As a junior, he averaged 17.1 points, 2.8 assists and 2.7 rebounds per game, and was a Second Team All-Patriot League selection. On January 2, 2021, Jaworski made his senior season debut, recording a career-high 37 points, eight rebounds and four assists in a 90–89 overtime loss to Lehigh. As a senior, he averaged 21.5 points, 3.7 rebounds and 2.3 assists per game. Jaworski was named to the First Team All-Patriot League and led the conference in scoring. He chose to forgo his additional year of college eligibility.

Professional career
After going undrafted in the 2021 NBA draft, Jaworski joined the Atlanta Hawks for the 2021 NBA Summer League. He was signed by the Oklahoma City Thunder on October 16, 2021, but was waived the following day. He subsequently joined the G League affiliate, the Oklahoma City Blue.

On February 12, 2023, Jaworski was traded from the Iowa Wolves to the Lakeland Magic in exchange for Simisola Shittu.

Career statistics

College

|-
| style="text-align:left;"| 2017–18
| style="text-align:left;"| Lafayette
| 29 || 13 || 28.7 || .440 || .430 || .852 || 2.2 || 1.7 || .5 || .1 || 10.8
|-
| style="text-align:left;"| 2018–19
| style="text-align:left;"| Lafayette
| 30 || 29 || 30.6 || .505 || .489 || .864 || 2.9 || 2.7 || .7 || .0 || 14.6
|-
| style="text-align:left;"| 2019–20
| style="text-align:left;"| Lafayette
| 24 || 24 || 32.3 || .442 || .360 || .867 || 2.7 || 2.8 || 1.0 || .0 || 17.1
|-
| style="text-align:left;"| 2020–21
| style="text-align:left;"| Lafayette
| 15 || 15 || 36.1 || .463 || .398 || .913 || 3.7 || 2.3 || 1.5 || .0 || 21.5
|- class="sortbottom"
| style="text-align:center;" colspan="2"| Career
| 98 || 81 || 31.3 || .463 || .422 || .876 || 2.7 || 2.4 || .8 || .0 || 15.1

References

External links
Lafayette Leopards bio

1999 births
Living people
American men's basketball players
Basketball players from Pennsylvania
Lafayette Leopards men's basketball players
Oklahoma City Blue players
Shooting guards